Final league standings for the 1988 Western Soccer Alliance season.

League standings

Playoffs

Bracket

Semifinal

Final

Points leaders

Honors
 MVP: Marcelo Balboa
 Leading goal scorer: Scott Benedetti
 Leading goalkeeper: Jeff Koch
First Team All League
Goalkeeper: Todd Strobeck
Defenders: Marcelo Balboa, Grant Gibbs, Arturo Velazco, Jeff Stock
Midfielders: Peter Hattrup, Billy Thompson, Tomás Boy
Forwards: Justin Fashanu, Eddie Henderson, Abuelo Cruz

Second Team All League
Goalkeeper: Bob Ammann
Defenders: Mario Gonzalez, Daryl Green, Danny Pena, Martín Vásquez
Midfielders: Chris Dangerfield, Dzung Tran, Jerome Watson
Forwards: Scott Benedetti, Chance Fry, John Sissons

External links
The Year in American Soccer - 1988
 1988 Western Soccer Alliance

Western Soccer Alliance seasons
2

nl:Amerikaans voetbalkampioenschap 1988